Elmer is an unincorporated community in Rapides Parish, Louisiana, United States. Elmer has a post office with ZIP code 71424, which opened on May 15, 1888.

References

Unincorporated communities in Rapides Parish, Louisiana
Unincorporated communities in Louisiana